Shek Yam Estate is a public housing estate in North Kwai Chung, New Territories, Hong Kong. It was the first Government Low Cost Housing Scheme estate in Kwai Chung. It had 8 blocks built in 1968, which were all demolished in the 1990s and 2000s.

Ning Fung Court is a Home Ownership Scheme court in North Kwai Chung, near Shek Yam Estate and Shek Yam East Estate. It has 4 blocks built in 2001.

Background
The estate was redeveloped into 4 phases. Phase 2 consists of three rental residential blocks, a car park podium and a shopping centre which were completed in 2000. Phase 3 consists of four HOS concord-typed blocks, Ning Fung Court. Phase 1 and Phase 4 were handed over to Leisure and Cultural Services Department to construct a park, Sham Yam Lei Muk Road Park. Phase 5 was the old site of Shek Yam Community Hall and a HOS building, but it was renamed Lai Shek House and changed to rental use.

Houses

Shek Yam Estate

Ning Fung Court

Demographics
According to the 2016 by-census, Shek Yam Estate had a population of 8,657 while Ning Fung Court had a population of 3,816. Altogether the population amounts to 12,473.

Politics
Shek Yam Estate and Ning Fung Court are located in Shek Yam constituency of the Kwai Tsing District Council. It was formerly represented by Andrew Wan Siu-kin, who was elected in the 2019 elections until May 2021.

Education
Shek Yam is in Primary One Admission (POA) School Net 64, which includes multiple aided schools (schools operated independently of the government but funded with government money); none of the schools in the net are government schools.

See also

Public housing estates in Kwai Chung

References

Kwai Chung
Public housing estates in Hong Kong
Residential buildings completed in 1968
Residential buildings completed in 2000
Residential buildings completed in 2006